Elbert Lee West (July 22, 1967 – May 18, 2015) was an American country music artist. Initially a session songwriter in Nashville, Tennessee, West saw his first chart success in the 1990s as a co-writer on singles for country singer Tracy Lawrence, including the Number Ones "Sticks and Stones" and "Can't Break It to My Heart". West co-wrote album tracks for other artists, including tracks for Tim McGraw and John Michael Montgomery.

Biography
Elbert West was born on July 22, 1967. Early in his musical career, West wrote songs for Tracy Lawrence, Tim McGraw, and John Michael Montgomery.

By 2001, he had signed to Broken Bow Records, then a newly formed independent label, and his debut album, Livin' the Life, was released that year. West co-wrote ten of the album's thirteen tracks, while others – including "(This One's Gonna) Leave a Mark", previously recorded by John Michael Montgomery – were co-written by Randy Archer and Johnny Park, formerly of the duo Archer/Park. "Diddley", which peaked at No. 56 on the Billboard Hot Country Singles & Tracks charts, was the album's lead single and West's only single to chart. "Diddley" was also made into a music video, which aired on CMT. Erik Hage of AllMusic gave the album four stars out of five, saying, "West has a big, husky baritone, a keen songwriting ability, a defiant attitude, and is a major country talent." After a falling out over a record, West left Broken Bow Records.

In 2013, West started having seizures. He died in Portland, Tennessee on May 18, 2015 at the age of 47 from a stomach aneurysm. West is survived by his wife Tammy and their three children.

Discography

Livin' the Life (2001)

Track listing
"Crawlin' Time" (Judy Hoffman, Elbert West) – 3:22
"Side of the Road" (D. Scott Miller,  West) – 3:46
"Diddley" (Doc James Shapiro, C.B. Carter) – 2:52
"Neon Light" (West, Earl Clark) – 3:35
"(This One's Gonna) Leave a Mark" (John Michael Montgomery, David Lee, Johnny Park, West) – 3:34
"Unpredictable" (Miller, West) – 2:35
"Livin' the Life" (Randy Archer, West) – 3:33
"Robin Loves to Hear Me Sing" (Miller, John Ramey) – 4:21
"My Last Resort" (Miller) – 3:08
"Sinner" (Miller, West, Ken Prueitt) – 3:46
"Middle of the Line" (Lee, West) – 3:14
"Everything That He's Not" (Miller, West, Stewart Harris) – 5:23
"Kiss My Lips Goodbye" (Miller, West, Even Stevens) – 2:57

Personnel
Steve Brewster – drums, percussion
Gary Burnette – six-string bass guitar, electric guitar, mandolin
John Cowan – background vocals
Steve Mackey – bass guitar, tic tac bass
Russ Pahl – six-string bass guitar, banjo, Dobro, acoustic guitar, electric guitar, steel guitar, gut string guitar, sitar, talk box guitar, tic tac bass
James Pennebaker – fiddle, electric guitar, steel guitar
Laura Vida – background vocals
Barry Walsh – piano
Elbert West – lead vocals

Singles

Music videos

References

1967 births
2015 deaths
American country singer-songwriters
BBR Music Group artists
Singer-songwriters from West Virginia
People from McDowell County, West Virginia
Country musicians from West Virginia